Maurer is a German surname, translating in English to "bricklayer" or "wall builder." Notable people with the surname include:

Adrian Maurer (1901–1943), American football player
Alfred Maurer (politician) (1888–1954), Estonian politician
Alfred Werner Maurer (born 1945), German architect, urban planner and art historian
Alfred Henry Maurer (1868–1932), American artist
Andreas Maurer (tennis) (born 1958), German professional tennis player
Andreas Maurer (Austrian politician) (1919–2010), Austrian politician
Andreas Maurer (German politician) (born 1970), German local politician
Andy Maurer (1948–2016), American football player
Angela Maurer (born 1975), German long-distance swimmer
Bill Maurer (born 1968), American academic scholar of legal and economic anthropology
Brandon Maurer (born 1990), American professional baseball pitcher
Chris Maurer (born 1984), former bassist of ska band Suburban Legends
Claude Maurer (born 1975), Swiss sailor
Daphne Maurer, Canadian professor of experimental psychology (visual perception)
Dave Maurer (American football) (1932–2011), American football player and coach
Dave Maurer (baseball) (born 1975), Major League Baseball pitcher
David Warren Maurer (1906–1981), professor of linguistics
Dóra Maurer (born 1937), Hungarian artist
Franciszek Maurer (1918–2010), Polish architect, artist, and professor
Friedrich Maurer (handballer) (1912–1958), Austrian field handball player
Friedrich Maurer (linguist) (1898–1984), German linguist and medievalist
Georg Ludwig von Maurer (1790–1872), German statesman and historian
Georg Maurer (1907–1971), German poet, essayist, and translator
German Mäurer (1811–1883), German writer and labor leader
Hermann Maurer (born 1941), Austrian computer scientist
Howard Maurer (born 1935), American musician, performer and actor
Hubert Maurer (1738–1818), German painter, graphic artist and art professor
Ingo Maurer (1932–2019), German lighting designer
Ion Gheorghe Maurer (1902–2000), Romanian politician
James Hudson Maurer (1864–1944), American trade unionist
Jeff Maurer (born July 9, 1947), American businessperson
Jimmy Maurer (born 1988), American soccer player 
Joan Howard Maurer (1927–2021), American writer and actress
John Maurer (born 1964), American punk musician
John J. Maurer (1922–2019), American politician
José Clemente Maurer (1900—1990), German Cardinal of the Roman Catholic Church
José Maurer (1906–1968), Argentine actor of Jewish ancestry
Joshua D. Maurer (born 1964), American film producer, writer and actor
Jost Maurer, German mason, architect and construction entrepreneur
Julius Maximilian Maurer (1857–1938), Swiss meteorologist
Jürgen Maurer (born 1967), Austrian actor
Konrad von Maurer (1823–1902), German legal historian and collector of Old Norse folklore
Kurt Maurer (born 1926), Swiss footballer
Lea Maurer (born 1971), American former competition swimmer
Linus Maurer (1926–2016), American cartoonist
Louis Maurer (1832–1932), German-born American lithographer
Lucille Maurer, the first woman Treasurer of Maryland
Ludwig Maurer (1859–1927), German mathematician
Ludwig Wilhelm Maurer (1789–1878), German composer, conductor, and violinist
Marc Maurer (born 1951), American lawyer
Marco Maurer (born 1988), Swiss ice hockey player
Mario Maurer (born 1988), Thai actor and model
Matthias Maurer (born 1970), German European Space Agency astronaut and materials scientist
Melanie Maurer (born 1988), Swiss cyclist
Michel Maurer (1904–1983), Luxembourgian boxer
Mike Maurer (born 1975), Canadian football player
Neža Maurer (born 1930), Slovene poet and writer
Norman Maurer (1926–1986), American writer, director and producer of films and TV shows
Oscar Maurer (1870–1965), American photographer
Peter Maurer (born 1956), Swiss diplomat
Reiner Maurer (born 1960), German footballer and football manager
Reinhart Maurer (born 1935), German philosopher and professor
René Maurer (born 1936), Swiss high jumper
Rob Maurer (born 1967), American baseball player
Robert D. Maurer (born 1924), American scientist and expert in fibre optics
Sigrid Maurer (born 1985), Austrian politician
Stefan Maurer (1960–1994), Swiss cyclist
Steve Maurer (born 1947), American politician
Tim Maurer (born 1980), former lead singer of ska band Suburban Legends
Tommy Maurer (born 1960), American soccer player
Traudl Maurer (b. 1961), German ski mountaineer
Ueli Maurer (cryptographer) (born 1960), Swiss professor of computer science
Ueli Maurer (born 1950), Swiss politician
Uli Maurer (born 1985), German ice hockey player
Ulrich Mäurer, German lawyer and politician
Walter Maurer (wrestler) (1893–1983), American wrestler
Walter Maurer (artist) (born 1942), German designer and university lecturer

See also
Murer, a list of people with the surname

German-language surnames